Commercial Vehicle Inspection (CVI), is the enforcement of safety regulations and laws of commercial vehicles. Some U.S. state departments of transportation refer to it as CVE (Commercial Vehicle Enforcement). CVI enforcement can be done roadside by state troopers or at specific stations, sometimes called "weigh stations."

Below are of some of the things that are checked for:
inadequate tires
brake linings that are oil soaked
cracked brake linings
brake linings with inadequate (worn) thickness
cracked frames
fuel leaks
disqualified drivers
overweight vehicles
oversize vehicles (vehicle dimensions)
hours-of-service (how long a driver has driven for)
driver qualifications
permit conditions
cargo securement
mechanical fitness
insurance status

References 

Road haulage
Law enforcement in the United States
Law enforcement units